Coleman Independent School District is a public school district based in Coleman, Texas (USA).

In 2009, the school district was rated "academically acceptable" by the Texas Education Agency.

In 2012, Novice ISD closed in the summer due to financial troubles, and formally consolidated with Coleman ISD on March 1, 2013.

Schools
Coleman High School (Grades 9-12) has about 300 students and it was built in 1975.
Coleman Junior High School (Grades 6-8) has 203 students as of 2006-2007 and it was Built in 1984.
Coleman Elementary School (Grades PK-5) has 475 students as of 2006–2007.

References

External links
Coleman ISD

School districts in Coleman County, Texas